WMIR "Rejoice 1200" is an Urban contemporary gospel radio station at 1200 AM and 103.5 FM  licensed to Atlantic Beach, South Carolina and targeting a primarily Black audience.

History
WMIR signed on in the late 1990s with a southern gospel format. After several years, the station changed its musical emphasis, with positive results.

Reggie Dyson, general manager of WMIR, said his station played a role in the 2002 BeachFest and planned live broadcasts from the June 2008 Beachfest, the third event of its type in the area.

On February 10, 2017, WMIR began a simulcast on WXJY "Rejoice FM" in Georgetown. On June 23, 2017, WMIR changed callsigns to WJXY. The WXJY simulcast ended in February 2019. The call sign reverted to WMIR on March 23, 2021.

WMIR added the translator W238CJ at 95.5.

References

External links

Gospel radio stations in the United States
Radio stations established in 2001
2001 establishments in South Carolina
MIR (AM)